Eusebius, also known as Eusebius the Arabian was an Arab sophist and tutor of the 4th century AD. known to had been active in Antioch during the reign of emperor Constantine I (306–337).  According to the Suda, Eusebius was a rival of the sophist Ulpianus, presumably at the city of Antioch. Eusebius has sometimes been misidentified with another figure by the name of Eusebius Pittacas, bishop of Emesa.

References

4th-century Arabs
4th-century Romans
Roman-era Sophists
Arabs in the Roman Empire